Nattväsen (English: Night Creatures) is the sixth studio album by the Viking metal band Månegarm. It was released in 2009.

Track listing

External links
Månegarm's official website

Månegarm albums
2009 albums